Pennsylvania House of Representatives District 164 includes part of Delaware County. It is currently represented by Democrat Gina Curry.

District profile
The district includes the following areas:

Delaware County:

 East Lansdowne
 Lansdowne
 Millbourne
 Upper Darby Township (PART)
 District 03 [PART, Divisions 06 and 07]
 District 04
 District 05 [PART, Divisions 01, 02, 03, 05, 07 and 10]
 District 06
 District 07

Representatives

Recent election results

References

External links
District map from the United States Census Bureau
Pennsylvania House Legislative District Maps from the Pennsylvania Redistricting Commission.  
Population Data for District 164 from the Pennsylvania Redistricting Commission.

Government of Delaware County, Pennsylvania
164